"Eternal Lover" may refer to:

Music
 "Eternal Lover", a 2004 music single by American singer CeCe Peniston
 "My Eternal Lover", a 1998 song by Indonesian extreme metal band Kekal

Literature
 Eternal Lover, a 2008 fantasy anthology by American writers Jackie Kessler, Richelle Mead and Hannah Howell
 Lover Eternal, a 2006 book of a paranormal romance Black Dagger Brotherhood series by American writer Jessica Bird
 The Eternal Lover, a 1925 fantasy-adventure novel by American writer Edgar Rice Burroughs
 A Hell of a Time, Eternal Lover, a 2008 dark paranormal book series by Kessler, see Hell on Earth 

Others
 Papaver rhoeas, a herbaceous species of flowering plant in the poppy family, often referred to as "Eternal lover flower" in Persian literature.